Confession is the third studio album by Taiwanese singer Pets Tseng. It was released on 16 August 2019, by AsiaMuse Entertainment, her first release with the label. Tseng co-wrote 2 out of the 10 tracks on the album.

Track listing

Music videos

References

External links
 AsiaMuse - 謎之音 

2019 albums
Pets Tseng albums